As Summers Die is a 1986 American made-for-television drama film starring Scott Glenn, Jamie Lee Curtis, Bette Davis and Beah Richards, directed by Jean-Claude Tramont. The film is loosely based on Winston Groom's 1980 novel of the same name about greed, bigotry and justice in late 1950s segregationist southern Louisiana. It was filmed in Quitman, Georgia and premiered on HBO on May 18, 1986. This is last television film produced by HBO Premiere Films before folden into HBO Pictures, the next HBO Premiere Films' should be Apology. It was later released on VHS by HBO/Cannon Video.

Plot
Lawyer Willie Croft (Glenn) is indifferent, letting his practice run itself, when the town's richest family begins a determined effort to obtain the farm of an old black woman, Elvira Backus (Richards). Elvira claims she was given her land by the dead family patriarch, Jonathan Holt, and finds an unlikely ally in Jonathan's aging sister, Hannah Loftin (Davis), whose mental competence is being challenged by the Holt clan. As for Croft, his growing involvement in the case intensifies when he begins to fall in love with Hannah's high-spirited niece, Whitsey (Curtis).

Cast
Scott Glenn  ...  Willie Croft  
Jamie Lee Curtis  ...  Whitsey Loftin   
Bette Davis  ...  Hannah Loftin  
John Randolph  ...  Augustus Tompkins
Beah Richards ...  Elvira Backus  
Ron O'Neal  ...  Daniel Backus  
Bruce McGill  ...  V.D. Skinner  
Richard Venture  ...  Brevard Holt  
John McIntire  ...  Judge Dudley McCormack   
Penny Fuller  ...  Marci Holt  
Paul Roebling  ...  Percy Holt  
CCH Pounder  ...  Priscilla  
Tammy Baldwin  ...  Wanda

References

External links
 

1986 films
1986 television films
1986 drama films
HBO Films films
Films shot in Georgia (U.S. state)
Films based on American novels
Films set in Louisiana
American drama television films
1980s American films